Irapuã is a municipality in the state of São Paulo in Brazil. The population is 8,048 (2020 est.) in an area of 258 km². The elevation is 428 m.

References

Municipalities in São Paulo (state)